= Liu Yingxia =

- Born: 1972 (wait for the actual date reported by the web); Harbin, Heilongjiang Province, China
- Political party: CPPCC National Committee member

Liu Yingxia (1972, Harbin, Heilongjiang Province, China), Family Name is Liu, vice-president of the Heilongjiang Industrial and Commercial Association. She coordinate the Heilongjiang Group construction, decoration, water conservation, and road construction company in Heilongjiang. She works also for the Dalian University of Science. Liu Yingxia is a CPPCC-, National Youth Joint Union and National Women Entrepreneurs Academy member.

Liu Yingxia after Northeast Mechanical College finished the Harbin Industry University with a master's degree. She cooperate the Harbin Industry University to find new material for the research center and develop northern medicines, which are produced in Hebei, Shandong, Shanxi and the north of Shaanxi. Mrs. Liu publish news articles about medicines.

She founded her company in 1992, when she was 20 years old.

"Rich lawyers are still a very small number in this sector. even though, many of us insist to work for those who are not able to pay for their cases. we have to remember being a lawyer, we take the responsibility to maintain justice" - Liu Yingxia.
